Johann Gottfried Heinrich Bellermann (10 March 1832 – 10 April 1903) was a German music theorist.  He was the author of Der Contrapunkt ("Counterpoint"), 1862, (Berlin, Verlag von Julius Springer—2nd ed., 1877; 3rd ed., 1887; 4th ed., 1901), and Die Grösse der musikalischen Intervalle als Grundlage der Harmonie ("The size of musical intervals as the foundation of harmony"), 1873 (Berlin, J. Springer).

Bellermann may be regarded as an influence on the Second Viennese School, as his Counterpoint was used by Arnold Schoenberg when teaching composition to pupils such as Alban Berg and Anton Webern.

Works (selection) 
 Motette, Psalm 90
 Christus der Erretter, Oratorium
 Drei Passionsmotetten for SATB a cappella
 Dreistimmige Fugen
 Lenzenslust, song, op. 19.3., 1854
 Frühlingslied, op. 19.5., 1867
 Auf dem Wasser, song, op. 19.6., 1854
 Lob der Vögelein, song, op. 19.7., 1857
 Wanderers Nachtlied, op. 19.9., 1856
 Erinnerung, song, op. 19.10., 1869
 Der frohe Wandersmann, song, op. 28.2., 1865
 Nun bricht aus allen Zweigen, song, op. 28.3. (d. 25 April 1871)
 Morgenlied, op. 28.5., 1880
 Wanderlied, op. 28.6. (9.4.12.1879)
 Der Pumpbrunnen, song, 28.7., (1851. Improved in May 1880 )
 Zu Grells Geburtstage, op. 28.8, 1880
 Abendlied, op. 28.9., 1878
 Frühlingslied, 8 voices, op. 28.10., 1879
 Abendstille, song, op. 31.2, 1882
 Frühlingslied, op. 31.2, 1882
 Zigeunerlied, op. 31.7., 3.28.8.1880
 An die Mark, song, op. 41.1., 1884
 Himmelfahrt, song, 41.2., 6 December 1883
 Die frühen Gräber, song, op. 41.3., 1883. Opening bars changed in Feb. 1891
 Frühlingslied, op. 41.4., 1889
 Auf dem See'', song, op. 41,5., (8 September 1889)

German music theorists
1832 births
1903 deaths
19th-century German musicologists